XHD may refer to:

 eXtreme Hard Drive, a feature on Gigabyte Technology motherboards which assists RAID setup
 External hard drive (hard disk drive)
XHD-FM, a radio station in Ixmiquilpan, Hidalgo
XHD-TV, a television station in Tampico, Tamaulipas